L'Orignal déchaîné (The Unchained Moose) is the French language student newspaper at Laurentian University in Sudbury, Ontario, Canada. Its English counterpart is Lambda.

The paper was launched in 1987.

Its name is a takeoff on the French satirical publication Le Canard enchaîné.

See also
List of student newspapers in Canada
List of newspapers in Canada

External links
 L'Orignal déchaîné

Laurentian University
Student newspapers published in Ontario
Newspapers published in Greater Sudbury
French-language newspapers published in Ontario
Weekly newspapers published in Ontario
Newspapers established in 1987
1987 establishments in Ontario